Buckeye Municipal Airport  is a city-owned public-use airport located  northwest of the central business district of Buckeye, a city in Maricopa County, Arizona, United States. The airport is included in the FAA's National Plan of Integrated Airport Systems for 2009–2013, which categorizes it as a general aviation facility. It is not served by any commercial airlines at this time.

Facilities and aircraft 

For the 12-month period ending April 22, 2009, the airport had 52,920 aircraft operations, an average of 144 per day: 99.8% general aviation, 0.2% military and <0.1% air taxi. At that time there were 44 aircraft based at this airport: 75% single-engine, 5% multi-engine, 9% helicopter and 11% ultralight.

History 
The field was originally an auxiliary airfield for Luke Air Force Base built during World War II. After the war it was obtained by the Town of Buckeye (now City of Buckeye) for use as a civilian airport.

References

External links 
 Airport page at City of Buckeye website
 
 Buckeye Municipal Airport (BXK) at Arizona DOT airport directory
 Aerial image as of 23 February 1992 from USGS The National Map

Airports in Maricopa County, Arizona